Cajón del Maipo is a canyon located in the Andean southeastern portion of the Santiago Metropolitan Region, Chile. It encompasses the upper Maipo River basin, where the river has entrenched itself in a narrow valley. The zone features a series of confluent rivers such as El Volcán River, Yeso River, and Colorado River, as well as other minor streams, including San Gabriel, Manzanito, Coyanco, El Sauce, El Manzano and San José. The main locality is San José de Maipo, the capital of the commune that includes all of the Andean sector of the Metropolitan Region. Several of the mountains are active volcanoes; San Jose was the most recent to erupt, in 1960.

The canyon is a popular tourist destination for hikers and campers. Among the most visited sites are the reservoir Embalse El Yeso, and El Morado Natural Monument which contains the San Francisco glacier.

References

External links
Cascada de las Animas  (Nature Sanctuary/Resort/Lodge/Adventure Center)
Santuario del Río (Lodge/Spa)

Landforms of Santiago Metropolitan Region
National Monuments of Chile
Canyons and gorges of Chile
Principal Cordillera